Hickmott is a surname. Notable people with the surname include:

Adrian Hickmott (born 1972), Australian footballer
Allerton C. Hickmott (1895–1977), American book collector
Edward Hickmott (1850–1934), English cricketer
Henry Hickmott (1853–1931), Australian farmer and politician
Michelle Hickmott (born 1985), English footballer
Peter Hickmott (born 1954), Australian footballer
Robert Hickmott (born 1969), Australian footballer and horse trainer
Rupert Hickmott (1894–1916), New Zealand cricketer
William Hickmott (1893–1968), English cricketer